The Duchy of Mangkunegaran is a small Javanese princely state located within the region of Surakarta in Indonesia.
It was established in 1757 by Raden Mas Said, when he submitted his army to Pakubuwono III in February, and swore allegiance to the rulers of Surakarta, Yogyakarta, and the Dutch East Indies Company, and was given an appanage of 4000 households.

The Palace of the rulers of Mangkunegaran was established by Raden Mas Said who signed a treaty with the Dutch East India Company (VOC) in 1757. By virtue of the treaty, he became the ruler of a part of Eastern Mataram and was henceforth known as Mangkunegara I. Known as Pura Mangkunegaran, the palace is located in the center of the city of Solo.

List of rulers
 Mangkunegara I (Raden Mas Said), 17571796
 Mangkunegara II (Raden Mas Sulama), 17961835
 Mangkunegara III, 18351853
 Mangkunegara IV, 18531881
 Mangkunegara V, 18811896
 Mangkunegara VI, 18961916
 Mangkunegara VII, 19161944
 Mangkunegara VIII, 19441987
 Mangkunegara IX, 19872021
 Mangkunegara X, 2022present

See also

 Legiun Mangkunegaran
 Pura Mangkunegaran
 List of monarchs of Java
 Kraton Yogyakarta

References

External links

Mangkunegaran Arms
Mangkunegaran Graveyard Solo

 www.mangkunegara4.org

 
Buildings and structures in Surakarta
States and territories established in 1757
Indonesian families